Pristimantis johannesdei is a species of frog in the family Strabomantidae. Its common name is Urrao robber frog. It is endemic to Colombia and found on the western flank of the Cordillera Occidental in the Antioquia and Risaralda Departments.
Its natural habitat is tropical moist montane forests. It is threatened by habitat loss.

References

johannesdei
Amphibians of Colombia
Endemic fauna of Colombia
Taxa named by Marco Antonio Serna Díaz
Taxa named by Juan A. Rivero
Amphibians described in 1988
Taxonomy articles created by Polbot